The Second Coming Tour was a concert tour by American R&B/soul singer D'Angelo. The tour was in support of his third studio album, Black Messiah, with performances of new songs and songs from his previous albums.

Opening acts
Raheem Bakaré 
Gary Clark, Jr. 
Meg Mac 
Pascal Le Boeuf Trio

Setlist
"Prayer" 
"Betray My Heart" 1
"1000 Deaths" 
"Ain't That Easy" 
"Vanguard Theme"  
"Feel Like Makin' Love"
"Really Love" 
"One Mo'Gin"
"The Star of a Story"
"Alright" 
"Brown Sugar" 
"The Charade" 
"Sugah Daddy" 
"Lady" 
"Back to the Future (Part I & II)" 
"Left & Right"
"Chicken Grease" 
"Till It's Done (Tutu)" 
"Untitled (How Does It Feel)"

1 performed at select venues in Europe and North America.

Band lineup
 Vocals, electric piano, guitar: D'Angelo
 Keyboards: Cleo "Pookie" Sample, Bobby Sparks II and Rodrick "Cliche" Simmons
 Guitar I: Jesse Johnson
 Guitar II: Isaiah Sharkey
 Bass guitar: Pino Palladino and Rocco Palladino
 Drums: Chris Dave, John Blackwell and Ahmir "Questlove" Thompson
 Percussion: Robert Lumzy
 Trumpet: Keyon Harrold
 Saxophone: Kenneth Whalum
 Background vocals: Kendra Foster, Charles Middleton, Jermaine Holmes, Joi Gilliam

Tour dates

References

External links
myspace.com-dangelo
okayplayer.com-dangelo

2015 concert tours
D'Angelo concert tours